10 Cloverfield Lane is a 2016 American science fiction psychological thriller film directed by Dan Trachtenberg in his directorial debut, produced by J. J. Abrams and Lindsey Weber and written by Josh Campbell, Matthew Stuecken, and Damien Chazelle. The second film in the Cloverfield franchise, it stars Mary Elizabeth Winstead, John Goodman, and John Gallagher Jr. The story follows a young woman who, after a car crash, wakes up in an underground bunker with two men who insist that an event has left the surface of Earth uninhabitable.

The film was developed from a script titled The Cellar; but under production by Bad Robot, it was turned into a spiritual successor to the 2008 film Cloverfield. It is presented in a third-person narrative, in contrast to its predecessor's found-footage style. Principal photography took place under the title Valencia in New Orleans, Louisiana, from October 20 to December 15, 2014.

10 Cloverfield Lane premiered in New York City on March 8, 2016, and was released in select countries on March 10. It was released in the United States on March 11, 2016, in both conventional and IMAX formats. The film grossed over $110 million worldwide. A successor, The Cloverfield Paradox, was released on February 4, 2018.

Plot

In March 2016, after an argument with her fiancé Ben, Michelle hurriedly packs a suitcase, leaves behind a diamond ring, and departs New Orleans. While she is driving through rural Louisiana at night, Ben calls, begging her to return. The news reports of blackouts in several major cities. Her car is suddenly struck and flips off the road.

Awakening in a concrete room, Michelle finds she has an injured leg and is chained to the wall. A man named Howard enters and unchains her. She later unsuccessfully ambushes him, and he explains that there has been a massive attack, perhaps by Russians or Martians, and he had found her wreck and saved her life by bringing her to his underground bunker. He tells a doubtful Michelle that they cannot leave for one or two years because the air is poisoned and everyone outside is dead.

Howard takes Michelle on a tour of the well-stocked bunker he built, which houses a third resident, Emmett, whose left arm is in a sling. Through a viewport, Howard shows her his two decayed pigs outside as evidence of the fallout, but she also sees Howard's truck, and regains the memory of it forcing her off the road. She privately relays this to Emmett, who dismisses it. He says he came to the bunker voluntarily, which he had helped Howard build, after actually seeing the attack happen and injuring his arm while fighting his way inside.

During their first dinner together, Howard shows little tolerance for Emmett and flashes of jealousy and rage. Michelle antagonizes him and steals his keys, but just before she opens the outer door a woman covered with lesions appears, screaming to be let inside. Horrified, Michelle retreats back. Howard confesses he accidentally struck Michelle's car while in a panic to get to the bunker. She uses her fashion design skills to stitch the cut she caused on his forehead, and Howard opens up about his daughter.

The trio begins to adapt to life underground. The air ventilation system fails after something loud passes overhead, and Howard sends Michelle through a small duct to turn it back on. In the mechanical room, she finds a padlocked skylight with "HELP" scratched on the inside and an earring she had seen in a picture Howard showed her of his daughter. She shares this with Emmett, who recognizes the girl in the picture as a local girl who had gone missing two years earlier. They decide to seek help and Michelle begins to fashion a makeshift hazmat suit so one of them can go outside.

Howard finds some of the hidden tools Michelle and Emmett are using for their plan and threatens to immerse them both in perchloric acid. Emmett takes responsibility, claiming he was building a weapon to use to get Howard's gun and impress Michelle. Howard accepts Emmett's apology before shooting him in the head, telling a shocked Michelle that now they can be a family of two. While Howard cleans up, Michelle works to finish the suit. He discovers the suit, but she flees and is able to upend the barrel of acid onto him, which disfigures him and starts a fire. She dons the suit and narrowly escapes outside. When she sees birds overhead, she removes her gas mask, but then observes an alien biomechanical craft floating in the distance. When the bunker explodes, the craft turns in her direction and drops off a quadrupedal creature. Michelle shelters in Howard's truck from the creature and from a flammable green gas the craft emits. The craft's tentacles draw the truck toward its maw, but Michelle finds materials for a Molotov cocktail and destroys it.

Michelle drives off. A radio broadcast says there has been some success in the fight against the invaders and instructs survivors to seek safety in Baton Rouge, but also requests the help of anyone with medical or combat training in Houston. Michelle heads for Houston while a larger alien craft is revealed by lightning.

Cast
 Mary Elizabeth Winstead as Michelle
 John Goodman as Howard Stambler
 John Gallagher Jr. as Emmett DeWitt
 Suzanne Cryer as Leslie
 Bradley Cooper as Ben (voice)

Production

Development

10 Cloverfield Lane originated from an "ultra low budget" spec script penned by Josh Campbell and Matt Stuecken, titled The Cellar. The Tracking Board included the script in "The Hit List" of 2012 – an annually published list of spec scripts written within the year that have impressed its voting members. In 2012, Paramount Pictures bought the script and commenced further development under Bad Robot Productions for Insurge Pictures, Paramount's specialty label for films with a micro-budget. When Bad Robot became involved, the film was assigned the codename Valencia to keep exact details of the production a secret.

Damien Chazelle was brought in to rewrite Campbell and Stuecken's draft and direct the film. Chazelle dropped out from directing when his Whiplash project received funding. On April 3, 2014, it was reported production for Valencia was greenlit to begin in the fall of 2014, under the direction of Dan Trachtenberg with the latest draft being written by an uncredited Daniel Casey. A budget of about $5 million was reported to be expected, in keeping with the mandate of Paramount's Insurge division of producing micro-budgeted films.

On July 8, 2014, Variety reported John Goodman was in negotiations to star in the film. On August 25, 2014, they reported Mary Elizabeth Winstead had entered negotiations, and on September 22, 2014, John Gallagher Jr. reportedly joined the cast.

During production, the filmmakers noticed core similarities to Cloverfield, and decided to make the picture what Abrams calls "a blood relative" or "spiritual successor" of that film. "The spirit of it, the genre of it, the heart of it, the fear factor, the comedy factor, the weirdness factor, there were so many elements that felt like the DNA of this story were of the same place that Cloverfield was born out of," said Abrams. In other interviews he explained: "Those characters and that monster [from Cloverfield] are not in this movie, but there are other characters and other monsters," and "This movie is very purposefully not called Cloverfield 2, because it's not Cloverfield 2, [...] So if you're approaching it as a literal sequel, you'll be surprised to see what this movie is. But while it's not what you might expect from a movie that has the name Cloverfield in it, I think you'll find that you'll understand the connection when you see the whole thing." Winstead and Gallagher mentioned that during production they were aware that the film had thematic similarities to Cloverfield, but did not learn that there would be an official connection until they were informed of the chosen title, only a few days before the release of the trailer. Abrams came up with the title after finishing Star Wars: The Force Awakens.

In a March 2015 interview, a few months after production wrapped, Winstead was asked about her experience during Valencia and described it as a "really contained film", reiterating the premise of The Cellar about a woman being trapped with her mysterious savior in a supposed post-nuclear fallout world. Later in the month, Insurge Pictures was reported to have been dismantled and its staff absorbed by its parent company. Insurge's only film that had yet to be released was reported to be Valencia. Speaking of rewrites that took place during production, Winstead called them "nothing that was major".

During an interview with Abrams to promote 10 Cloverfield Lane, he said the creative team behind the original had some ideas on developing Cloverfield 2, but the release of films such as Godzilla and Pacific Rim led them to abandon them as they found the concept of kaiju films played out.

Filming
Principal photography on the film began on October 20, 2014, in New Orleans, Louisiana. Filming took place in chronological order on only one set. Scenes involving explosions, fire, and smoke were shot in early December 2014 in Hahnville, Louisiana. Filming ended on December 15, 2014.

Music
Bear McCreary composed the music for the film. The soundtrack was digitally released on March 11, 2016.

Marketing
The film's title was revealed on January 15, 2016, in a trailer attached to 13 Hours: The Secret Soldiers of Benghazi. As with Cloverfield, a viral marketing campaign was used that included elements of an alternate reality game. Bad Robot kick-started the campaign in early February 2016 by updating the Tagruato.jp website used for the original film. The campaign revealed backstory information about the character Howard Stambler and his daughter.

Release
The film was released in select countries on March 10, 2016, in regular and IMAX theaters, before its official release in North America on March 11, also in conventional and IMAX theaters. Those who attended screenings of the film at AMC IMAX theaters were eligible to receive collectible movie posters, which illustrated the three main characters separately. The film was rated PG-13 by the Motion Picture Association of America for "thematic material including frightening sequences of threat with some violence, and brief language".

Reception

Box office
10 Cloverfield Lane grossed $72.2 million in the United States and $38.1 million in other territories for a worldwide total of $110.2 million.

In the United States and Canada, the film made $1.8 million from its Thursday night previews at 2,500 theaters, and $8 million on its first day (including Thursday previews). In its opening weekend, it earned $24.7 million, finishing in second place at the box office behind Zootopia ($51.3 million), which was in its second weekend.

Outside North America, 10 Cloverfield Lane received a staggered release, across 54 countries. It earned $1.5 million in its opening weekend from six international markets with a bulk of it coming from Australia ($1 million). Overall, the top openings were in the United Kingdom and Ireland ($2.2 million), South Korea ($1.7 million), and France ($1.4 million).

Critical response
On Rotten Tomatoes, 90% of 312 critic reviews are positive, with an average rating of 7.5/10. The site's critical consensus reads, "Smart, solidly crafted, and palpably tense, 10 Cloverfield Lane makes the most of its confined setting and outstanding cast—and suggests a new frontier for franchise filmmaking." According to Metacritic, which calculated a weighted average score of 76 out of 100 based on 43 critics, the film received "generally favorable reviews". Audiences polled by CinemaScore gave the film an average grade of "B−" on an A+ to F scale.

Bill Zwecker of the Chicago Sun-Times gave 10 Cloverfield Lane four stars out of four, commending the film as "continually gripping and extremely engrossing ... [Dan Trachtenberg] helmed this film with artistry, imagination and skillful precision." Jeannette Catsoulis of The New York Times praised the cast's performance and Jeff Cutter's cinematography, while writing: "Sneakily tweaking our fears of terrorism, '10 Cloverfield Lane,' though no more than a kissing cousin to its namesake, is smartly chilling and finally spectacular. A sequel is virtually a given." Alan Scherstuhl of the Village Voice also praised the acting and technical aspects, but wrote that the film "is less compelling in terms of character and meaning."

In a mixed review for Slant, Chuck Bowen found a lack of character development between the three leads, and labeled the film's ending as anticlimactic. Bowen also writes: "The film hits its expositional narrative marks and nothing else ... 10 Cloverfield Lane will almost immediately evaporate from the mind, before J.J. Abrams commences in selling you the same thing all over again." Soren Andersen of the Seattle Times, who gave 10 Cloverfield Lane one and half stars out of four, similarly criticized the film's ending, labeling it as "full-bore" and "Too little. Too late." James Verniere of the Boston Herald disapproved of the characters and pacing, and he ultimately described the film as "a crummy, low-rent, intellectually bereft thriller."

Accolades

Future

Having originally planned the film as a direct sequel to Cloverfield, Abrams suggested that he had thought of something which, if they were lucky enough to get it made, "could be really cool [insofar as it] connects some stories" in a third film, even teasing a larger Cloverfield universe. Interviews with Trachtenberg and Winstead confirm that the movie is, and always was intended to be, an expansion of the first film, with Trachtenberg calling it the "Cloververse". Winstead has voiced her interest in returning for another installment.

In October 2016, it was revealed that the Abrams-produced God Particle would be the third installment in the Cloverfield franchise. After several postponements of the film's release date, it was released as a Netflix Original on February 4, 2018, under the new title The Cloverfield Paradox.

In The Cloverfield Paradox, Donal Logue cameos as Mark Stambler, a conspiracy theorist discussing the "Cloverfield Paradox"; reviewers observed that the character shares the same surname as Howard Stambler in 10 Cloverfield Lane. Suzanne Cryer, who appeared as Leslie in 10 Cloverfield Lane, also appears in a brief cameo role as a newscaster who interviews Stambler.

See also
 List of films featuring extraterrestrials

References

External links
 
 
 
 
 
 

2016 films
2010s disaster films
2010s monster movies
2016 science fiction films
2010s science fiction thriller films
2016 psychological thriller films
2010s psychological drama films
Alien invasions in films
American disaster films
American monster movies
American thriller drama films
American science fiction drama films
American science fiction thriller films
American psychological thriller films
American psychological drama films
2016 thriller drama films
Bad Robot Productions films
2010s English-language films
Films about kidnapping in the United States
Films about extraterrestrial life
Films produced by J. J. Abrams
Films set in bunkers
Films set in Louisiana
Films shot in New Orleans
Films shot in Louisiana
IMAX films
Paramount Pictures films
Cloverfield (franchise)
2016 directorial debut films
2016 drama films
Films scored by Bear McCreary
Films directed by Dan Trachtenberg
2010s American films